Erateina undulata is a species of moth in the family Geometridae first described by William Wilson Saunders in 1860. These day-flying moths are typically montane and can be  found in Neotropical cloud forests of Colombia.

References
 Encyclopedia of Life
 Discover Life
 GBIF

Larentiinae
Moths described in 1860
Geometridae of South America
Moths of South America
Taxa named by William Wilson Saunders